Ghousi Shah(Persian/Urdu:) (July 1893 – June 1954) was a Muslim Sufi, saint, scholar, writer and poet from the Indian subcontinent; whose poetry in Urdu and Persian is considered to be among the greatest of the modern era. Tayyabat-E-Ghousi is considered one of the famous poetric book in tasawwuf which has a collection of poems - Hamd, Na`at, Manqabath, Rubaiyat . He was the most famous disciple and successor of Syed Kamalullah Shah also known as Machiliwale Shah who in turn became the spiritual master of India’s noted Sufi saints. He was born on 1 July 1893 CE in Hyderabad corresponding to 16th zil haj 1310 hejiri.

Biography
He was 20 when his father died in 1913.  Ghousi Shah studied under Maulana Hameedullah. He learnt Urdu, Arabic, Persian: Fiqh, Hadith, Tafseer. He also learnt calligraphy. Ghousi Shah embodied in his person, all the elements of Akhlakhe Muhammadi – the character of the Islamic prophet  Mohammed. Ghousi Shah Saheb was a total transparent person. His surrender to God was total.  As an orator, he left a deep, intimate impact upon his listeners. He would stir their hearts by his powerful words. As an interpreter of wahdatul wujood he was unique. He was a great Khateeb – an orator who left a great impact upon the audience. Masnavi Maulana Rum in an extremely impressive manner and he was a great interpreter of arabi.  He would baffle us by his simple interpretation of the complex problems of Sufism. He would build a healthy rapport with his students.

Spiritual history
His father, Alhaj Kareemullah Shah, brought him up and initiated him in Tasawwuf. He developed love for Allah after the initiation. This love grew into great passion and ishq, after he met Machiliwale Shah. He took Baiyat under him and was awarded khilafath instantly. It was a turning point in his life.  Syed Kamalullah Shah(Machiliwale Shah) a businessman from Mysore, surrendered himself to Syed Sultan Mahmoodullah Shah Hussaini, when he first met him in Secunderabad. The meeting transformed him totally. He was initiated in the order. Ghousi Shah was a one-year child, when Syed Sultan Mahmoodullah Shah Hussaini died.

Successor
Four months before his death in an impressive speech before a huge audience of murideen he declared his son, Sahvi Shah to be his successor(Janasheen). He said that it is the will of God that Sahvi Shah should take over from him.  Peer Ghousi Shah( gave khilafath through his son's hand to his four disciples Mohammad Abdul Quadir Shah Saheb, Syed Khasim Shah Sahab, Sadullah Khan Sahab and Abdur Rasheed Sahab. These lines are written in the dargah stone of  Peer Ghousi Shah

Title
 Kanzul Irfan
 Abul Eeqan
 Shaikh Akber Thani
 Qutub-e-Deccan

Sayings
Sayings of Peer Ghousi Shah
FAITH:
 If the life of a Muslim is surcharged with faith, and if he combines both intellect and action in discharging his day to day duties, he shall spread light throughout the world, by virtue of his faith.
 Prayer is a cardinal virtue of life and after prayer, if any other virtue is to be cultivated, it is the respect your should show towards the God – conscious and God – fearing. Observe the creation and accept the creator.
 LA ILAHA ILALLAH: If u realize the significance of La Ilaha Ilallah, the doors of meaning will open. And you should know what is the meaning of God.
 Elements of IMAN E KAMIL – the perfect faith.
 Performing prayers with stead fastness.
 Spending the wealth of God.
 Surrendering oneself to God’s Will.
Fear of God.
 Strengthening the faith.

Influence
 Maulana Abdus Samad: A student of Deoband commenting about his scholarship has said "I have not seen a greater interpreter of Masnavi Maulana Rum than Ghousi Shah.
 Allama seemab Akabarabadi: He once wrote "how I only wish I had seen him from a distance".
 Maulana Maudoodi: Maulana Maudoodi was all praise for his learning when he had a detailed meeting with him in the company of Nisar Yar Jung.
 Allama Ashraf Ali Thanvi: Allama Ashraf Ali Thanvi  paid rich tributes for his interpretation of the problem of determinism.
 Syed Abdullah Shah: Syed Abdullah Shah on his death said "once I went to listen to Hazrath Ghousi Shah Saheb’s sermon. He explained the intricacies of Tawheed quite coherently. Only a man of his calibre could do it. One has to wait for ages to expect such persons of distinction. Hazrath is no more. We must make the best use of the presence of Hazrath Sahvi Shah, his successor – a boon for all of us.
 Nawaab Liaqat Jung: Nawaab Liaqat Jung while lauding the efforts of the Namaz committee in propagating the movement of namaaz said "in fact, a movement of this type was founded by Hazrath Ghousi Shah, who organized a huge movement to inculcate religious values".
 Syed Badshah Hussaini Quadri: Hazrath Syed Badshah Hussaini Quadri also paid rich tributes to the personality of Ghousi Shah. Hazrath Ghousi Shah has dedicated his life to propagate Islam, Iman (faith), Tawheed (faith in the unity of God), Piety and Ihsan. His books are alive, his teachings are alive. He is thus alive. It is just a question of paying attention to his books to reap the benefits.

Disciples
Approximately 10 thousand people were his disciples through all over India. In the disciples many followers were educated. His disciples have spread his teachings throughout India and abroad.

Khulafa
Maulana Bareeq Shah
Maulana Hakeem
Abdul Hameed Shah
Syed Khasim Shah
 Abdul Basith Shah(Bellary)
Maulana Abdul Ghani Saheb
 Syed Wajid Ali Shah
 Faqeer Mohammed Shah
 Dr Ghulam Dastageer Rasheed Ph.D
 Shaik Mohammed Shah
 Moulana Shah Husamuddin Quadri (Karda,Mumbai)
 Maulana Sheikh Mohiuddin Hilal Akbari
 Ghouse Khan
 Galeb Saheb
 Sayyid Ahamed Mohiyudheen NooriShah Jeelani
 Abdul Quddoos, Waheedullah Shah
 Naser Ali Shah(London
 Hakeekm Shah Maqdoom Ashraf(Chennai)
 Maulana Ghaffar Shah
 Abdur Rasheed.

Books
 Kanze Maktoom (Sharha Mathnawi Bahrul Uloom)
 Majoone Mohammadi
 Jawahere Ghousi
 Maqsad-E-Bayet (Ghousi Shah discusses bayet – taking a spiritual pledge. He discusses the purpose, virtues, necessity, kinds of bayet).
 Tayyebat-E-Ghousi (A collection of poems-Hamd, Naat, Manqabath, Rubaiyat. There are thumris-thumri on the Prophet and Meraj).
 Noor-Un-Noor (A book on the interpretation of Wahadatul Wujood).
 Kalima-E-Tayaba The book discusses the significance of Kalim-E-Tyebba – the bedrock of Islam. The book also discusses awareness of self, awareness of God, revelation, Prophethood etc.,.
 Falahe Muslims
 Maeete Elah

Death
Ghousi Shah Saheb died on 4th Shawwal, 1373 hejire corresponding to Sunday, 6 June 1954 CE in Hyderabad. He was buried in his father mosque Masjid-E-Kareemullah Shah, 15-6-341, Begum bazaar, Hyderabad, India.

Urs
His annual Urs is organized by his present successor Moulana Ghousavi Shah on 4th Shawwal every year. Moulana Ghousavi Shah (Secretary General: The Conference of World Religions and President: All India Muslim Conference) and other religious scholars presides the function every year. The Urs celebrations will end with sama (Qawwali Programme) at Baith-Un-Noor, Hyderabad. People from all corners of country irrespective of cast and creed comes to attend this occasion every year.

Related
 Mahmoodullah Shah
 Machiliwale Shah
 Kareemullah Shah
 Moulana Sahvi Shah
 Alhaj Moulana Ghousavi Shah

See also
Moinuddin Chishti
Nizamuddin Awliya

References 

1893 births
1954 deaths
Sufi mystics
20th-century Indian poets
Indian Sufis
Sufi poets
Indian male poets
Indian Muslim scholars of Islam
20th-century Indian male writers